File Commander is a text mode orthodox file manager for Microsoft Windows, OS/2 and Linux operating systems created and maintained by Brian Havard. It is an enhanced clone of Norton Commander, originally developed for OS/2 but ported to Microsoft Windows in 1997 and to Linux in 2011. Development started in 1993, which makes File Commander one of the oldest surviving text interface file managers (younger than DOS Navigator and Volkov Commander, but older than FAR Manager). Functionality has been greatly extended with features such as support for regular expressions in file selection, a powerful editor with undo/redo capabilities, network awareness, etc. 

In 1998 the OS/2 version was selected as "The Best Disk/File Utility for OS/2" by the independent OS/2 e-Zine magazine.

Although stable releases are infrequent, the program is continuously updated, and current betas are available on the File Commander Development page.

The latest version 2.50 beta is also available for various UNIX operating systems including Linux, FreeBSD and OpenSolaris.

File Commander can also run in DOS with the help of HX DOS Extender.

See also
Comparison of file managers

External links

The Orthodox File Manager (OFM) Paradigm, description of File Commander
OS/2 e-Zine 1998 Reader's choice for Disk / File Utilities

References

Utilities for Windows
Utilities for Linux
OS/2 software
Orthodox file managers
Shareware
DOS software